Wan Hai Lines, Ltd. is a Taiwanese shipping company founded in 1965. Since then, it has become one of the largest players in the container shipping industry, with a fleet of 142 vessels and a carrying capacity of 430,854 TEUs as of January 2023.

History
At the beginning, Wan Hai's business was mainly on the log transportation between Taiwan, Japan, and the Southeast Asia. In 1976, in order to respond to the rapid development of international trade in the Asia Pacific area and the trend of international transportation containerization, Wan Hai has entered the business of container vessel shipping. More recently, Wan Hai expanded its Asia shipping network to services to Canada, US, South America, Africa, and Middle East.

In August 2017, a new weekly service to Cambodia from Taiwan was added, also regularly calling China and Thailand for loading and discharging cargo.

In August 2018, an order for 20 new ships, of which 8 larger and 12 small feeder ships, were called to be built at Japanese and Chinese Shipyards.

On 21 January 2021, an order was placed for 50,000 new containers from China International Marine Containers due to shortages in the international container market caused by the COVID-19 pandemic.

Fleet

See also
 List of companies of Taiwan
 List of largest container shipping companies

References

External links

Shipping companies of Taiwan
Container shipping companies
Companies based in Taipei
Transport companies established in 1965
Taiwanese brands
1965 establishments in Taiwan